Abhishek Arunkumar Jhunjhunwala (born 1 December 1982) is an Indian first-class cricketer.  He played for the Royal Bengal Tigers and the Indian World Team in the Indian Cricket League Twenty20 competition, before signing for the Rajasthan Royals in the Indian Premier League. In his second match for the Royals, he hit a half-century.

In the 4th season of IPL, he played for Pune Warriors India. In the 5th season of IPL, he moved to Deccan Chargers.

Abhi is now playing for Teddington CC having moved from Richmond CC to become Teddington's Director of Cricket.

References

Indian cricketers
Bengal cricketers
East Zone cricketers
1982 births
Living people
Rajasthan Royals cricketers
Pune Warriors India cricketers
Deccan Chargers cricketers
Seth Anandram Jaipuria College alumni
University of Calcutta alumni
ICL World XI cricketers
Royal Bengal Tigers cricketers